Sarah Monahan (born 12 April 1977) is an Australian former child actress. Best known for her role as Jenny Kelly on Hey Dad..!, she also appeared in Sons and Daughters and Home and Away.

Early career
Monahan got her start in the industry from her fashion designer father. She was the in-house model for his children's clothing line, and later, went on to appear in over 100 television and print ads.

Hey Dad..!
Monahan auditioned for the role of Jenny in Hey Dad..! when she was six. Even though the producers were looking for a younger actress, her small stature at the time, combined with her ability to read the script, helped her to win the role. After filming the pilot, she spent a short time on the Australian soap opera Sons and Daughters, playing the role of Cassie Hunt in 24 episodes that first aired in early 1986. She returned to filming on Hey Dad..! that year, and stayed with the show for six years, departing in 1993 one year before the show concluded. She became the primary income earner for her family when her father died just before Hey Dad...! debuted.

Later career
Monahan returned to Australian television for a short time as Heather in another long running Australian soap opera, Home and Away, in 1995 and alongside fellow Hey Dad..! actress, Simone Buchanan in Pacific Drive, performing a non-speaking role.

Monahan later founded ShrimpTank Productions, which works in social media and search engine optimisation, along with Going Down, a planned travel and diving web series.

Monahan authored a book, titled "Allegedly" which was released by New Holland Publishers on March 7, 2016.

Sexual assault
In March 2010, Monahan claimed in an interview with Woman's Day magazine, and later on current affairs television program A Current Affair, that she was sexually abused on the set of Hey Dad...! by Robert Hughes, the actor who played her on-screen father. Hughes strongly denied the allegations and claimed to have engaged defamation lawyers.

During an interview aired on A Current Affair in March 2011, Monahan expressed her concerns that charges may not be laid against Hughes. She stated that she intended to initiate legal actions against Hughes and television executives who, she claimed, were aware of Hughes' alleged actions and failed to take action. After her allegations in the media, Braveheart, a sexual assault advocacy group, asked Monahan to become an ambassador.

Hughes was arrested in London on 9 August 2012. His extradition to Australia was approved on 28 September 2012. In early April 2014, Hughes was found guilty of sexually abusing young girls.

Personal life
Monahan lives in the US with her American husband, Matt Morris, whom she met in Brisbane, Australia.

In 2011, Monahan joined the Texas State Guard Medical Brigade, a branch of the Texas Military Forces whose focus is on humanitarian missions, and remained as a medical officer for the guard until 2014.

Sarah has been an active campaigner for rights for child actors, and victims of sexual assault. She teamed up with Derryn Hinch to campaign for a sex offender registry in Australia, she has participated in social media campaigns such as #LetHerSpeak and #JusticeShouldntHurt. She is part of American charity, A Minor Consideration, and has spoken publicly at conferences on being a leader in speaking up on abuse.

References

External links
 
 Going Down
 Personal website

1977 births
Actresses from Sydney
American atheists
Australian atheists
Australian expatriate actresses in the United States
Australian emigrants to the United States
Australian television actresses
Australian child actresses
Australian whistleblowers
Childfree
Living people
Military medical personnel of the United States
Naturalized citizens of the United States
Texas State Guard personnel